Water II: At Safe Distance is the seventh studio album by Zoogz Rift, released in June 1987 by SST Records.

Track listing

Personnel 
Adapted from the Water II: At Safe Distance liner notes.
Zoogz Rift – vocals, guitar, production

Musicians
 Jack Brewer – vocals (A2, A4, B3)
 Scott Colby – slide guitar
 Mark Crawford – drums, percussion
 Alan Eugster – violin (A4, B2), synthesizer (A4, B2)
 Henry Kaiser – guitar (A5, B3, B4)
 Willie Lapin – bass guitar
 Eddy O'Bryan – guitar (A4, A5, B5), bass guitar (A4, A5, B5)

Musicians (cont.)
 Aaron Rift – vocals (A4), toy piano (A4)
 John Trubee – Minimoog (A4)
 Craig Unkrich – keyboards
Production and additional personnel
 John Golden – mastering
 Marc Mylar – recording, saxophone (A3)

Release history

References

External links 
 Water II: At Safe Distance at iTunes
 

1987 albums
SST Records albums
Zoogz Rift albums